Campbelltown Stadium, formerly Orana Park and Campbelltown Sports Ground, is a multi-use stadium in Leumeah, New South Wales, Australia, owned by Campbelltown City Council. It is the home ground of the Western Suburbs Magpies and the Wests Tigers rugby league clubs. The stadium has a nominal capacity of 18,000, with a recorded highest crowd figure of 20,527 for a game between Wests Tigers and North Queensland Cowboys in the 2005 NRL season. It is located adjacent to Leumeah railway station and Wests Leagues Club.

The ground is due for a major upgrade as A-League Men expansion club Macarthur FC became the 12th club admitted into the league and will be based at the ground.

History

The area which Campbelltown Stadium occupies, was developed in the early 1960s by the then Campbelltown 'Shire' Council, as a rudimentary sporting field, in the very much rural and undeveloped Leumeah area. Council named the new ground, 'Orana Park'.

The Campbelltown City Kangaroos, playing in the Group 6 Rugby League competition, were the first major tenants of the ground, having been moved from their original home ground on Queen St, Campbelltown. Orana Park would soon become the premier venue of the local Group 6 senior competition, hosting all Grand Finals from 1974–1983 and representative fixtures, including a famous clash in 1975 between Group 6 and France, won 2-nil by the locals. A boundary change for the 1984 season, saw Orana Park become a part of the new Newtown- Campbelltown Junior League. The Kangaroos remained as co-tenants of the Orana Park facility until 1997, when the No.2 field was developed into the region's top athletics facility, in time for the 2000 Olympic Games.

The Stadium- Orana Park- had a functional purpose in the lives of most young Campbelltownians, also doubling as the local athletics track for school carnivals.

Orana Park first played host to top level Rugby League in the 1983 NSWRFL season, when the moribund Newtown Jets played half of their home games at Orana Park (with a view to a permanent move for the 1984 season). A bumper crowd of 10,686 turned out for the Round 1 clash, to see reigning 1982 premiers, the Parramatta Eels decimate the Jets 54–14. Bluebags officials, led by John Singleton and partnered by pre-eminent local solicitor John Marsden, were determined to move the ailing Club full-time to Campbelltown to claim the burgeoning junior league in the Campbelltown LGA, and to expand their thin supporter base. However, before the deal could be made, Newtown were excluded from the 1984 season for financial reasons. Orana Park/ Campbelltown Stadium would be the site of the Newtown club's last top-level Rugby League competition match, a 9–6 victory over the Canberra Raiders on Saturday 27 August 1983. The club continued efforts to be re-instated for the 1985 season, fully based in Campbelltown. Based upon Newtown's dire financial position, the Campbelltown side of the merger withdrew its support for entry into the NSWRL Premiership of 1985, consigning the Jets to premiership oblivion. The Jets would be successfully resurrected in the NSWRL Metropolitan Cup (Second tier competition) in 1991.
 
For 1985–86, there was no top-level rugby league tenant at the Stadium. One NSWRL game a year was played at the stadium by Parramatta and Eastern Suburbs respectively. South-western Sydney was still considered neutral, but 'ripe' territory for all of the inner-Sydney based clubs. Ironically, it was the struggling Western Suburbs Magpies in 1987 who made the move from their inner western base of Lidcombe. 'The Pies' had been the opponents of the Eastern Suburbs club in that solitary game at Orana Park in 1986. Led by astute CEO Rick Wayde, the Magpies rapidly moved to secure a more assured future for the Club, based in this rapidly expanding population centre. The Magpies had also been threatened with expulsion from the 1984 premiership, along similar lines as those of Newtown. Wests also assumed control of the bankrupt Leagues Club that sat next to the venue; rebranding it as 'Wests Leagues Campbelltown'. This time, Campbelltown Rugby League powerbroker John Marsden assented to the Magpies taking control of the now vast Campbelltown- Liverpool Junior League. The NSWRL rubber stamped that Orana Park- Campbelltown Stadium would become a 1st Grade Rugby League venue.

Sports played at Campbelltown Stadium

Rugby league
In the National Rugby League, the stadium was home to the Western Suburbs Magpies club from 1987 until 1999 and was one of the home grounds for the Newtown Jets in 1983. The Magpies had merged with the Balmain Tigers for the 2000 season to form the Wests Tigers, and thus, since 2000, this ground is being used on an occasional basis by the Wests Tigers, with four of their twelve annual home games played there, in accordance with their stadium deals. The Western Suburbs Magpies junior teams and Ron Massey Cup side also play most of their home games at Campbelltown.

The record crowd for the ground for a rugby league match has been 20,527 between the Wests Tigers and the North Queensland Cowboys on 14 August 2005. The record crowd for Campbelltown in its previous oval configuration was 17,286 between Western Suburbs and St George on 2 August 1991. The record crowd for Newtown at the stadium is 10,686 against rival Parramatta in 1983.

List of rugby league test matches played at Campbelltown Stadium.

Association football
On 19 July 2008 Australian A-League Men team Sydney FC played their first Pre-Season Cup match against Brisbane Roar. Sydney won the match 2–1 in front of roughly 4,500 fans. Sydney FC also played a pre-season friendly here in preparation for their 2010–11  season against local club Macarthur Rams in which Sydney won 1–0.

Sydney FC played their first premiership match for A-League points at Campbelltown Stadium against Perth Glory on 18 January 2012 (originally to be played on 7 December 2011). The game ended up in a 1–1 draw and drew 5,505 fans.

The stadium was host for the local Macarthur Football Association Premier League finals in September 2012.

Western Sydney Wanderers FC defeated Newcastle Jets FC 2–1 in a 2012–13 season Regional Round match at the venue. The game was attended by 10,589 fans. The Wanderers would return to the stadium against the same opposition in the 2016–17 season during the redevelopment of Parramatta Stadium. In 2016, Western Sydney Wanderers FC announced that the club would be playing all their 2017 AFC Champions League games at Campbelltown Stadium.

In the 2018–19 A-League season, the stadium played host to a match between Wellington Phoenix FC and Sydney FC in front of 5,115 people. Sydney FC won 1–0.

The stadium also hosted a 2019 FFA Cup match between Sydney United 58 and Western Sydney Wanderers in which the Wanderers won 7–1 in front of 5,061 people.

In February 2020, the stadium played host to five matches in the 2020 AFC Women's Olympic Qualifying Tournament.

From the 2020–21 A-League season, Macarthur FC were formed and played their home games at the ground.

References

External links

Sports venues in Sydney
Rugby league stadiums in Australia
Rugby union stadiums in Australia
Soccer venues in Sydney
Western Suburbs Magpies
Wests Tigers
New South Wales Waratahs
A-League Men stadiums
A-League Women stadiums
Sydney FC (A-League Women)